Leighton-Ray Marcelino van Wyk (born ) is a South African rugby union player for the  in the Currie Cup and the Rugby Challenge. His regular position is centre.

References

South African rugby union players
Living people
1994 births
People from George, South Africa
Rugby union centres
Falcons (rugby union) players
Pumas (Currie Cup) players
Rugby union players from the Western Cape